San Juan Teitipac is a town and municipality in Oaxaca in south-western Mexico. The municipality covers an area of 11.48 km². 
It is part of the Tlacolula District in the east of the Valles Centrales Region.

As of 2005, the municipality had a total population of 2,552.

The town's 16th-century church is notable for a number of colonial-era santos (statues of the saints), some of them in the refined Spanish tradition and others of intriguing folk design.

References

Municipalities of Oaxaca